Mariemont may refer to:

 Mariemont, California, in El Dorado County
 Mariemont, Ohio, planned community in Hamilton County, Ohio, United States
 Mariemont, Belgium, former hunting estate created in 1546 by Queen Mary of Hungary
 Mariemont Hill near Osława river, Zagórz, Poland